Siddhartha Bank Limited (SBL) is one of the largest private Commercial Bank in Nepal which is 18th commercial bank to be liscenced by Nepal Rastra Bank. It started operation in Dec 2002.  
and has 197 branches all across the nation with its head office in Kathmandu which provides entire commercial banking services and remittance services. 

The bank's shares are publicly traded as an 'A' category company in the Nepal Stock Exchange.

Siddhartha Bank Limited is committed to providing its customers with excellent service, innovative products, and state-of-the-art technology. The bank has a strong focus on corporate social responsibility and is actively involved in various social and environmental initiatives.

Siddhartha Bank Limited has received several awards and recognitions for its performance and contribution to the banking industry in Nepal. It has been awarded as the 'Bank of the Year' by The Banker, a leading financial magazine, and has also been recognized by various organizations for its contribution to the economy and society.

Correspondent Network
The bank has been maintaining correspondent relationships with various international banks from various countries to facilitate trade, remittance and other cross-border services. Through these correspondent, the bank is able to provide services in any major currencies in the world.

SBL Remit 
SBL Remit is a remittance service offered by Siddhartha Bank Limited in Nepal. It is a fast and secure way to send money from anywhere in the world to Nepal. With SBL Remit, customers can send money to their loved ones in Nepal using their mobile device or computer.

SBL Remit offers competitive exchange rates and low fees for its services. The service is available 24/7, and customers can track their transactions in real-time. SBL Remit also offers a variety of payment options, including bank transfers and cash pick-up at any Siddhartha Bank branch in Nepal.

SBL Remit is committed to providing its customers with a reliable and efficient service. It has a dedicated customer support team that is available to assist customers with any questions or concerns they may have. With SBL Remit, customers can rest assured that their money will be delivered quickly and securely to their loved ones in Nepal.

See also

 List of banks in Nepal
 Commercial Banks of Nepal

References

External links
 Official Website of Siddhartha Bank Limited
 Official Website of Nepal Rastra Bank

Banks of Nepal
Banks with year of establishment missing